Taddeo Altini, O.S.A. (1609 – 27 August, 1685) was a Roman Catholic prelate who served as Bishop of Civita Castellana e Orte (1653–1685) and Titular Bishop of Porphyreon (1646–1653).

Biography
Taddeo Altini was born in 1603 in Camerino, Italy and ordained a priest in the Order of Saint Augustine.
On 17 December 1646, he was appointed during the papacy of Pope Innocent X as Titular Bishop of Porphyreon.
On 10 November 1653, he was consecrated bishop by Giovanni Battista Maria Pallotta, Cardinal-Priest of San Silvestro in Capite, with Celso Zani, Bishop Emeritus of Città della Pieve, and Alessandro Vittrici, Bishop of Alatri, serving as co-consecrators. 
On 10 November 1653, he was appointed during the papacy of Pope Innocent X as Bishop of Civita Castellana e Orte.
He served as Bishop of Civita Castellana e Orte until his death on 27 August 1685.

Episcopal succession
While bishop, he was the principal co-consecrator of:
Camillo Massimi, Titular Patriarch of Jerusalem (1654);
Ambrogio Landucci, Titular Bishop of Porphyreon (1655);
Sigismondo Isei, Bishop of Comacchio (1655); and  
Giovanni Battista Federici, Bishop of Sagone (1655).

References

External links and additional sources
 (for Chronology of Bishops) 
 (for Chronology of Bishops)  
 (for Chronology of Bishops) 
 (for Chronology of Bishops) 

17th-century Italian Roman Catholic bishops
Bishops appointed by Pope Innocent X
1609 births
1685 deaths
People from Camerino
Augustinian bishops